Women's Combined World Cup 1981/1982

Calendar

Final point standings

In Women's Combined World Cup 1981/82 all 4 results count.

Note:

Race 2 not all points were awarded (not enough finishers).

References
 fis-ski.com

World Cup
FIS Alpine Ski World Cup women's combined discipline titles